Omorgus nocheles is a species of hide beetle in the subfamily Omorginae.

References

nocheles
Beetles described in 1990